Frank Kane (March 9, 1895 in Whitman, Massachusetts – December 2, 1962 in Brockton, Massachusetts), nicknamed "Sugar", was an outfielder in Major League Baseball in 1915 and 1919. His minor league career stretched as late as 1928.

Sources

Major League Baseball outfielders
1895 births
1962 deaths
Baseball players from Massachusetts
Brooklyn Tip-Tops players
New York Yankees players
Major League Baseball left fielders
Providence Grays (minor league) players
Wilkes-Barre Barons (baseball) players
Newark Bears (IL) players
Toledo Mud Hens players
Jersey City Skeeters players
Buffalo Bisons (minor league) players
Reading Keystones players
Rochester Tribe players
Springfield Ponies players
Waterbury Brasscos players